Kitson Julie (born 28 July 1983) is a Seychellois former boxer.

Kitson qualified for the 2004 Summer Olympics by winning that year's African Championship gold medal in Gaborone. He competed in the light welterweight event at the Games in Athens and was defeated in the first round by his Australian opponent .

As of 2014, Julie was still boxing and had moved up to heavyweight level.

References

Seychellois male boxers
1983 births
Living people
Olympic boxers of Seychelles
Boxers at the 2004 Summer Olympics
Light-welterweight boxers